The first Sicilian monarch was Roger I, Count of Sicily. The last monarch was King Ferdinand III of Sicily; during his reign, the Kingdom of Naples merged with the Kingdom of Sicily. The subsequent monarchs were Kings of the Two Sicilies.

See also:

List of monarchs of Sicily
List of monarchs of Naples
Kings of Naples family tree

Sicily
Family